The South Dakota State Fair is an annual state fair held in Huron, SD. It is held for five days over Labor Day Weekend. The fair is operated by the South Dakota Department of Agriculture and Natural Resources.

References

External links
 

State fairs
Buildings and structures in Huron, South Dakota
South Dakota culture
Festivals in South Dakota
Festivals established in 1885